VasalloVision was a small Spanish-language television network in the United States that catered to the Mexican audience. Most of its schedule consisted of films, lucha libre, and children's programming. The network was made up of four stations, mostly in the western part of the country.

All its affiliates would affiliate with MundoMax upon its launch on August 13, 2012, and the network wound down operations on that same date.

Former affiliates

References

External links
 

Defunct television networks in the United States
Spanish-language television networks in the United States
Television channels and stations established in 2009
Television channels and stations disestablished in 2012